Dário Frederico da Silva (born 11 September 1991), commonly known as Dário or Dário Júnior, is a Brazilian footballer who plays in the for.

Career
In July 2014, Dário Júnior signed a two-year contract with Portuguese Segunda Liga side C.D. Trofense.
A year later, Dário Júnior signed for newly promoted Azerbaijan Premier League side Kapaz.
On 26 January 2018, Dário Júnior returned to Kapaz, signing a one-year contract.

On 11 June 2018, Dário Júnior signed a one-year contract with Neftçi.

On 30 January 2019 Neftçi announced that they had sold Dário Júnior to Daegu.

On 14 June 2019, Dário Júnior returned to Neftçi on a two-year deal from Daegu. On 10 July 2020, Dário was released by Neftçi after his contract was terminated by mutual consent.

On 23 July 2020, Dário Júnior signed contract with Riga FC.

Career statistics

References

External links

1991 births
Living people
Association football forwards
Association football midfielders
Brazilian footballers
Brazilian expatriate footballers
Expatriate footballers in Azerbaijan
Brazilian expatriate sportspeople in Azerbaijan
Expatriate footballers in South Korea
Brazilian expatriate sportspeople in South Korea
Expatriate footballers in Latvia
Latvian Higher League players
Liga Portugal 2 players
Azerbaijan Premier League players
K League 2 players
K League 1 players
C.D. Trofense players
Kapaz PFK players
Seongnam FC players
Neftçi PFK players
Daegu FC players
Riga FC players